Saint Brendan of Birr (died c. 572) was one of the early Irish monastic saints. He was a monk and later an abbot, of the 6th century. He is known as "St Brendan the Elder" to distinguish him from his contemporary and friend St Brendan the Navigator of Clonfert. He was one of the Twelve Apostles of Ireland, a friend and disciple of Saint Columba.

Background
In early Christian Ireland the druid tradition collapsed with the spread of the new faith. Study of Latin learning and Christian theology in monasteries flourished. Brendan became a pupil at the monastic school at Clonard Abbey. During the sixth century, some of the most significant names in the history of Irish Christianity studied at the Clonard monastery. It is said that the average number of scholars under instruction at Clonard was 3,000. Twelve students who studied under Saint Finian became known as the Twelve Apostles of Ireland; Brendan of Birr was one of these.

Life
Brendan of Birr is said to have been of a noble Munster family. It was at Clonard that Brendan became a friend and companion of Ciarán of Saigir and Brendan of Clonfert.

He founded the monastery at Birr in central Ireland in about 540, serving as its abbot.  He emerges from early Irish writings as a man of generous hospitality with a reputation for sanctity and spirituality who was an intuitive judge of character. He was considered one of the chief prophets of Ireland.  This is evidenced both in his title ('Prophet of Ireland'), and by his attendance at the synod of Meltown, in which Saint Columba was brought to trial over his role in the Battle of Cúl Dreimhne in 561.  Brendan spoke on Columba's behalf, prompting the assembled clerics to sentence Columba with exile rather than excommunication. His friendship and support for Columba resulted in important connections between Birr and the Columban foundations. An adviser of Columba said that the saint saw a vision of Brendan's soul being carried away by angels after his death.  He thereupon ordered for a mass to be said in his honour.

The feast day of Brendan of Birr is 29 November.

Brendan's monastery at Birr was later to produce the MacRegol Gospels, which are now housed at the Bodleian Library in Oxford.

See also
History of Roman Catholicism in Ireland
Early Christian Ireland

References

570s deaths
Irish Christian monks
6th-century Christian saints
Medieval Irish saints
Medieval saints of Meath
People from County Offaly
6th-century Irish abbots
Religion in Birr, County Offaly
Year of birth unknown